was the brother of Shoichiro and the son of Toyota Motor Corporation founder, Kiichiro Toyoda.

Non-TMC posts 
 Intl. trustee, International House (1991–)
 Honorary consul (Nagoya), Denmark (1991–)
 Representative director, Institute for International Economic Studies (1996–)
 Senior advisor and member of the board, Toyota Central R&D Labs (2001–)
 Chairman, Toyota Technological Institute at Chicago (2002–)
 Representative director, Genesis Research Institute, Inc. (2009–)
 Chairman of the board, Toyota Technological Institute (June 2009–)
 Honorary chairman, Toyota Foundation (June 2009 )

Awards and citations 
 Medal with Blue Ribbon, Japan, 1992
 National Order of the Southern Cross, Brazil, 1994
 Grand Cordon of the Order of the Sacred Treasure, Japan, 1999
 Knight of the Order of the Dannebrog, Denmark, 2000

References

External links
 https://web.archive.org/web/20160224051911/http://toyotanews.pressroom.toyota.com/article_display.cfm?article_id=2284

1929 births
2017 deaths
Japanese businesspeople
People from Nagoya
Tatsuro
Toyota people
Presidents of the Japan Automobile Manufacturers Association